The 1999 Anambra State gubernatorial election occurred in Nigeria on January 9, 1999. The PDP nominee Chinwoke Mbadinuju won the election, defeating the ABC Nwosu, the APP candidate.

Chinwoke Mbadinuju emerged winner in the PDP gubernatorial primary election.
His running mate was Chinedu Emeka.

Electoral system
The Governor of Anambra State is elected using the plurality voting system.

Results
PDP's Chinwoke Mbadinuju emerged winner in the contest.

The total number of registered voters in the state for the election was 2,221,384. However, 2,249,600 were previously issued voting cards in the state.

References 

Anambra State gubernatorial elections
Anambra State gubernatorial election
Anambra State gubernatorial election